A74 or A-74 may refer to:

 A74 road, a major road in the United Kingdom
 A74(M) and M74 motorways, another road in the United Kingdom that largely replaced the original A74
 Benoni Defense, in the Encyclopaedia of Chess Openings
 HLA-A74, an HLA-A serotype
 Iceberg A-74, an iceberg calved from the Antarctic Brunt Ice Shelf in February 2021